Tachina venosa is a species of fly in the genus Tachina of the family Tachinidae that is endemic to Europe.

References

Insects described in 1824
Diptera of Europe
venosa